Better Off Dead may refer to:

Film and television
 Better Off Dead (film), a 1985 teen romantic comedy starring John Cusack
 "Better Off Dead" (CSI), an episode of CSI
 "Better Off Dead" (Medium), an episode of Medium

Literature
 Better Off Dead, a 2021 Jack Reacher novel by Lee and Andrew Child

Music
 Better Off Dead (album) or the title song, by Sodom, 1990

Songs
 "Better Off Dead", by Bad Religion from Stranger than Fiction, 1994
 "Better Off Dead", by Bill Withers from Just as I Am, 1971
 "Better Off Dead", by Elton John from Captain Fantastic and the Brown Dirt Cowboy, 1975
 "Better Off Dead", by The Faders from Plug In + Play, 2005
 "Better Off Dead", by Golden Earring from Millbrook U.S.A., 2003
 "Better Off Dead", by Grinspoon from Easy, 1999
 "Better Off Dead", by Ice Cube from AmeriKKKa's Most Wanted, 1990
 "Better Off Dead", by Jxdn from Tell Me About Tomorrow, 2020
 "Better Off Dead", by Lostprophets from Weapons, 2012
 "Better Off Dead", by Motörhead from Snake Bite Love, 1998
 "Better Off Dead", by New Found Glory from New Found Glory, 2000
 "Better Off Dead", by Rod Stewart from Foolish Behaviour, 1980
 "Better Off Dead", by Sleeping with Sirens from Madness, 2015
 "Better Off Dead", by The Sounds from Something to Die For, 2011
 "Better Off Dead", by Wipers, 1978
 "Over My Head (Better Off Dead)", by Sum 41, 2002

See also
 "You're Better Off Dead!", a song by Children of Bodom, 2002